Nykken is a symphonic poem composed by the Norwegian composer Geirr Tveitt in 1957. 

It is written for orchestra and several solo instruments, although they do not have any solo roles. It was written on demand for the Norwegian Broadcasting Corporation (NRK) and survived a fire in 1970 by being kept safe in their archives. It is built on a Norwegian legend about the sea-creature nøkken, and is based on a story about him transforming into a beautiful, white horse and getting out of a silent pond. The horse lures a young boy onto its back and takes him with it back into the pond, generating a great disturbance in the normally so silent water. A normal performance lasts about 16–18 minutes.

Nykken (Norwegian) or Näcken (Swedish), originating from Old Norse, is a spirit said to exist along the borders of water and land. People would often say prayers to the Nykken before swimming so that no harm would come to them.

Compositions by Geirr Tveitt
1957 compositions
Symphonic poems